Gibina is a settlement in the Slovene Hills in northeastern Slovenia. It lies in the Municipality of Sveti Andraž v Slovenskih Goricah. The area is part of the traditional region of Styria. It is now included with the rest of the municipality in the Drava Statistical Region.

References

External links
Gibina at Geopedia

Populated places in the Municipality of Sveti Andraž v Slovenskih Goricah